The King's Daughter is a 1916 British silent historical film directed by Maurice Elvey and starring Gerald Ames, Janet Ross and Edward O'Neill. The film is based on a novel by Alexandre Dumas.

Cast
 Gerald Ames as Montrose 
 Janet Ross as Hélène  
 Edward O'Neill as The King 
 Hayford Hobbs as Dubois  
 Hubert Willis as Chief of Police

References

Bibliography
 Klossner, Michael. The Europe of 1500-1815 on Film and Television: A Worldwide Filmography of Over 2550 Works, 1895 Through 2000. McFarland & Company, 2002.

External links
 

1916 films
British historical drama films
British silent feature films
1910s English-language films
Films directed by Maurice Elvey
1910s historical drama films
Films set in France
Films based on French novels
Films based on works by Alexandre Dumas
British black-and-white films
1916 drama films
1910s British films
Silent historical drama films